Wings of Joy is the debut studio album by English rock band Cranes. The album was released on 16 September 1991 by Dedicated Records. It followed the band's mini-album Self-Non-Self, released two years earlier.

Critical reception

Ned Raggett of AllMusic found that Wings of Joy reflected Cranes' musical development, noting that while their "gripping, chilling atmosphere... hasn't moved an inch", the album showed the band continuing "to expand its palette."

Track listing

Personnel
Credits are adapted from the album's liner notes.

Cranes
 Matt Cope – guitar
 Mark Francombe – guitar
 Alison Shaw – vocals, bass
 Jim Shaw – drums, guitar, piano

Production
 Cranes – production
 Gail Lambourne – engineering

Design
 Robert Coleman – design

Charts

References

External links
 

1991 debut albums
Cranes (band) albums
Dedicated Records albums